One Place Live is a live album by Tasha Cobbs. Motown Gospel released the album on August 21, 2015. The album was recorded live in Greenville, South Carolina before 3,000 attendees at Redemption Church. This album charted on two Billboard magazine charts, The Billboard 200 at No. 28 and No. 1 on the Gospel Albums chart, selling 13,000 copies during its first week of sales. Some special appearances like Kierra Sheard, Jamie Grace, Jonathan Nelson  It has sold 80,000 copies as of September 2016.

Critical reception

Awarding the album four stars from CCM Magazine, Matt Conner states, "Cobbs' charisma and power continues to shine." Bob Marovich, giving the release five stars at the Journal of Gospel Music, writes, "The melodic songs, the expert pacing, and the strong singing make this one of the best gospel albums of the year." Rating the album a nine out of ten for Cross Rhythms, Tony Cummings describes, "The...Georgia-born singer and songwriter possesses an astonishing vocal armoury able to sing in a rich and expressive contralto".

Track listing

Chart performance

References

2015 live albums
Tasha Cobbs albums